Windermere is a residential area in the southwest portion of the City of Edmonton in Alberta, Canada. It was established in 2004 through Edmonton City Council's adoption of the Windermere Area Structure Plan, which guides the overall development of the area.

The area is represented by the Greater Windermere Community League.

Neighbourhoods 
The Windermere Area Structure Plan originally planned for six separate neighbourhoods. Today, the Windermere area includes the following:
Ambleside;
Glenridding Heights;
Glenridding Ravine;
Kendal;
Keswick; and
Windermere.

Land use plans 
In addition to the Windermere Area Structure Plan, the following plans were adopted to further guide development of certain portions of the Windermere area:
the Ambleside Neighbourhood Structure Plan (NSP) in 2005, which applies to the Ambleside neighbourhood;
the Glenridding Heights NSP in 2011, which applies to the Glenridding Heights neighbourhood;
the Keswick NSP in 2010, which applies to the Keswick neighbourhood; and
the Windermere NSP in 2006, which applies to the Windermere neighbourhood.

Surrounding areas

See also 
 Edmonton Federation of Community Leagues

References 

Neighbourhoods in Edmonton